The Tarashcha uezd was one of the subdivisions of the Kiev Governorate of the Russian Empire. It was situated in the central part of the governorate. Its administrative centre was Tarashcha.

Demographics
At the time of the Russian Empire Census of 1897, Tarashchansky Uyezd had a population of 245,752. Of these, 87.6% spoke Ukrainian, 9.4% Yiddish, 1.8% Polish, 1.0% Russian, 0.1% Tatar and 0.1% Belarusian as their native language.

References

 
Uezds of Kiev Governorate
1800 establishments in the Russian Empire
1923 disestablishments in Ukraine